Trilby Glover is an Australian actress known for her roles as Shoshanna in The Starter Wife mini-series, Jessica in the feature film Righteous Kill, and as Jane Hollis in the second season of Fox comedy-horror series Scream Queens.

Personal life
Glover married Ian Brennan in September 2016 and the couple have two children.

Career
Glover had a minor recurring role in the Starz network series Crash, with five appearances in 2008–2009.

In 2016, she appeared in the FOX television series Scream Queens, in a recurring role throughout the season.

Filmography

References

External links

 

Year of birth missing (living people)
Living people
Australian television actresses
People educated at Methodist Ladies' College, Perth
Australian film actresses
National Institute of Dramatic Art alumni
University of Western Australia alumni
Actresses from Perth, Western Australia